Lakafia is a surname. Notable people with the surname include:

Jean-Paul Lakafia (born 1961), French javelin thrower
Pierre-Gilles Lakafia (born 1987), French rugby union player
Raphaël Lakafia (born 1988), French rugby union player, brother of Pierre-Gilles and son of Jean-Paul